Rezyapovo (Räjäp) is a rural locality (a selo) in Chekmagushevsky District, Bashkortostan, Russia. The population was 532 as of 2010. There are 7 streets.

Geography 
Rezyapovo is located 26 km southwest of Chekmagush (the district's administrative centre) by road. Baybulatovo is the nearest rural locality.

References 

Rural localities in Chekmagushevsky District